These are statistics of Primera División de México for the 1990–91 season.

Overview
It was contested by 20 teams, and Pumas de la UNAM won the championship.

León was promoted from Segunda División.

Querétaro bought the franchise of Tampico Madero, which allowed the team to return to Primera División.

Irapauto was relegated to Segunda División.

Teams

Group stage

Group 1

Group 2

Group 3

Group 4

Results

Playoff

Final

First leg

Second leg

3–3 on aggregate. UNAM won on away goals.

References
Mexico - List of final tables (RSSSF)

Liga MX seasons
1990–91 in Mexican football
Mex